Chrudoš is a male first name, derived from the Czech word chruditi ("weaken"); therefore, Chrudoš literally means "boy who is weakened" and comes from the name Chrudim. It is mentioned in the Manuscripts of Dvůr Králové and of Zelená Hora (19th century). The name day is celebrated on 22 or 23 January or 25 October.

Nicknames 
Chruďa, Chrudík, Chrudko, Chrudošek, Došek, Chru

Famous bearers 
 Libuše, about brothers Chrudoš a Šťáhlav

References

External links 
 Veštírna

Czech masculine given names
Slovak masculine given names